Hamister is a village in southwestern Whalsay in the parish of Nesting in the Shetland Islands of Scotland. It lies to the north of Symbister, just to the northeast of Saltness and southeast of North Park.

References

External links

Canmore - Margaret: The Kletl, North Voe, Whalsay, North Sea site record

Villages in Whalsay